Mohsen Mirabi (born 8 August 1983) is an Iranian former professional footballer who played as a midfielder.

Career
Mirabi joined Rah Ahan F.C. in 2008.

Career statistics

References

1983 births
Living people
Iranian footballers
Association football midfielders
Rah Ahan players
Pas players